Helcomyza is a genus of flies in the family Helcomyzidae. There are at least three described species in Helcomyza.

Species
These three species belong to the genus Helcomyza:
H. mediterranea (Loew, 1854)
H. mirabilis Melander, 1920
H. ustulata Curtis, 1825

References

Helcomyzidae
Articles created by Qbugbot
Sciomyzoidea genera